The Hub was founded by London-based Tolù Adẹ̀kọ́, an entrepreneur with a background in interior design. Launched in September 2009, the magazine covers a range of lifestyle topics including Art & Culture, Design & Interiors, Travel & Leisure, Food & Drink, Entertainment, Fashion & Style, Beauty & Grooming and fashion stories.

Alongside its print materials, The Hub is known for its emphasis on editorial contributions by international creative figureheads. Anish Kapoor, David Downton, Diego Luna, Charming Baker, Daniel Chadwick and Lindsay Clarke have all spent time working with the magazine in the past.

The magazine is currently distributed in the United Kingdom, the United States, Canada, Brazil, Australia, New Zealand, Singapore, Taiwan, Hong Kong, Cyprus, France, Germany, Italy, Spain, Sweden, Norway and Austria. Each issue of the magazine centers around particular concept which is then reflected in the content. The second 'Renaissance'-themed issue includes an eight-page feature in which iconic paintings from the era are re-engineered into a high-fashion editorial.

The corresponding website, The Hub Online, is split into sections that mirror those in the magazine. There is also a selection of online exclusive columns such as 'Literature', 'The Conversation' and 'The Sound'. All online content is available at no cost to those who register with The Hub Online.

References

External links 
 Official website

Fashion magazines published in the United Kingdom
Lifestyle magazines published in the United Kingdom
Quarterly magazines published in the United Kingdom
Magazines published in London
Magazines established in 2009